FSSP may refer to:

Families of structurally similar proteins, a protein structures database
Federal Bailiffs Service (Russia), abbreviated FSSP in Russian
Firing squad synchronization problem, a problem in computer science and cellular automata
Frances Slocum State Park, a state park in Luzerne County, Pennsylvania
Priestly Fraternity of Saint Peter, a society of traditionalist Catholic priests and seminarians
Fresh Start Schools Programme, a programme for schools in South Africa
Forward Scattering Spectrometer Probe, a class of optical instruments designed to measure size and concentration of particles suspended in the air (such as cloud droplets)